Linkville is an unincorporated community in Marshall County, Indiana, in the United States.

History
Linkville was founded in 1866 by M. J. Link and others. A post office was established at Linkville in 1884, and remained in operation until it was discontinued in 1903.

References

Unincorporated communities in Marshall County, Indiana
Unincorporated communities in Indiana